Football Wives is an American reality television series that premiered October 24, 2010, on VH1. Football Wives showcases lives of the wives and girlfriends of professional football players.

Cast
 Amanda Davis, married to Dallas offensive lineman Leonard Davis
 Chanita Foster, wife of offensive lineman George Foster
 Melani Ismail, wife of former college and pro-football star Raghib Ismail
 Brittany Pigrenet, girlfriend of Dallas kicker David Buehler
 Dawn Neufeld, wife of Tight End Ryan Neufeld
 Erin McBriar, wife of Dallas Punter Mat McBriar
 Pilar Sanders, wife of retired All-Pro cornerback Deion Sanders
Mercedes Nelson, ex-girlfriend of Dallas Cowboys player

Episodes

References

2010s American reality television series
2010 American television series debuts
2010 American television series endings
African-American reality television series
VH1 original programming